The Lower Xiajiadian culture (2200–1600 BC) is an archaeological culture in Northeast China, found mainly in southeastern Inner Mongolia, northern Hebei, and western Liaoning, China. Subsistence was based on millet farming supplemented with animal husbandry and hunting. Archaeological sites have yielded the remains of pigs, dogs, sheep, and cattle. The culture built permanent settlements and achieved relatively high population densities. The population levels reached by the Lower Xiajiadian culture in the Chifeng region would not be matched until the Liao Dynasty. The culture was preceded by the Hongshan culture, through the transitional Xiaoheyan culture. The type site is represented by the lower layer at Xiajiadian in Chifeng, Inner Mongolia. 

According to a 2011 study published in the Journal of Human Genetics, "the West Liao River Valley was a contact zone between northern steppe tribes and the Central Plain farming population. The formation and development of the Lower Xiajiadian Culture population was likely a complex process affected by admixture of ethnically different people". Archaeological and DNA evidence supports examples that the people of the Lower Xiajiadian Culture immigrating to the south and contributed to the gene pool of the Central Plain population during the Bronze Age.

Stone, bone, and pottery artefacts were discovered at Lower Xiajiadian sites, while gold, lead, lacquer, jade, copper, and bronze artefacts are also found. The most commonly found copper and bronze artefacts are earrings.

People of the Lower Xiajiadian practiced oracle bone divination. The culture prepared its oracle bones by drilling and polishing the bones before heating them. Inscriptions are generally not found on examples of oracle bones of the Lower Xiajiadian.

People had good access to local sources of stone, primarily basalt, which were often used in construction and tool-making. Lower Xiajiadian houses were typically round, made from mud and stone, and were built with stone walls. Lower Xiajiadian settlements were built near and were protected by cliffs or steep slopes. Stone walls were sometimes erected around the non-sloped perimeter of its settlement. Walls were not thick. Walls with watchtowers and were built by sandwiching a rammed earth core with two sides of stone walls.

There are differing views among Chinese specialists on the origins of the people of the northern part of Lower Xiajiadian culture. One view is that they were perhaps related to the Sushen, who the Shang and Zhou named the non-Chinese people from the Northeast. Another view is that they were the Northern tribal conglomerations, like the Shanrong, Guzhu, Guifang, and Tufang. 

Professor Jin Jing-fan (of Jilin University) believes that certain parts of Shang culture has its origins in Dongbei. Along with professors Gan Zhi-geng and Guo Da-shun, they believe that Lower Xiajiadian contributed to some of the origins of both Shang and Yan cultures.

See also
 Upper Xiajiadian culture
 Xinglonggou
 Yueshi culture

Notes

References
 Shelach, Gideon, Leadership Strategies, Economic Activity, and Interregional Interaction: Social Complexity in Northeast China, 

Archaeology of Inner Mongolia
Archaeological cultures of China
Bronze Age in China
22nd-century BC establishments